To the Western World is a documentary film directed by Margy Kinmonth. Narrated by John Huston and starring Niall Tóibín, Patrick Laffan, Tom Hickey (actor) & Brendan Cauldwell, the film charts the journey of John Millington Synge and Irish artist Jack Butler Yeats through Connemara in 1905. The two men were sent by the Manchester Guardian to report on the 'Congested Districts', the most poverty-stricken and over populated parts of the West of Ireland. The film is the first dramatisation of the original articles, which disappeared for decades after their publication. On their journey they described the economic conditions, poverty, unemployment, dress and lie-stock.

The film has previously won the European Community Award and was nominated for the Fiction Award at the Cork Film Festival.

Screenings 
2009 Irish Film Institute and Dublin Theatre Festival’s “Unsung Synge”

References

External links 
 

1981 films
1980s English-language films